Show by Rock!! is an anime television series produced by Bones based on the video game franchise created by Sanrio. The series follows a girl named Cyan who warps into a world filled with music, and joins the rock group Plasmagica to battle against evil. The series is directed by Takahiro Ikezoe and written by Touko Machida, with music composed by Yasuharu Takanashi, Funta7 and Rega Sound. The original series aired in Japan between April 5 and June 21, 2015, and is licensed in North America by Funimation, who simulcast the series is aired and streamed a broadcast dub version from June 7, 2015. A short series, Show By Rock!! Short!!, aired between July 4 and September 19, 2016, and was also simulcast and dubbed by Funimation. A second season, Show By Rock!!#, began airing on October 2, 2016. The opening theme is  while the ending theme is "My Song is YOU!!", both performed by Plasmagica.

Episode list

Show by Rock!! (2015)

Show by Rock!! Short!! (2016)

Show by Rock!!# (2016)

Show by Rock!! Mashumairesh!! (2020)

Show by Rock!! Stars!! (2021)

Notes

References

Show by Rock!!